Top Buzz were a British breakbeat hardcore and jungle DJ/MC crew.

History
Top Buzz were originally formed in 1988 by MC Patrick Jarrett ("Mad P"), DJ Mikee B and DJ Jason Kaye. All originate from areas in north London, Tottenham and Enfield respectively.

They were one of the first to popularise the term jungle techno, meaning to encompass both jungle and techno influences as it began to emerge from the hardcore sound from 1991. They released Livin' in Darkness on Basement Records in 1992, which encapsulates much of the flavour of the era. They were headline performers at Amnesia House, Fantazia, Universe, Dreamscape and Obsession events, amongst many others.

A distinct feature was the ragga MCing of MC Patrick, strongly influenced by Jamaican dancehall. Patrick often referred to the team as "Two Blacks and a Bubble", a reference to their ethnic origins, with 'bubble' referring to Bubble and Squeak, the Cockney rhyming slang for Greek (Kaye is of Greek Cypriot descent).

Mikee B moved on to become part of UK garage outfit Dreem Teem, with a slot on BBC Radio 1 until May 2005.

Jason Kaye went on to become a successful and influential DJ, producer and promoter of UK garage. His record label, Social Circles, is widely considered to be one of the best underground record labels in the UK, and he founded the 'Garage Nation' series of events with Terry Turbo. 

Patrick Jarrett studied to become a chef, a trade that he is still doing today. Jarrett is the son of Cynthia Jarrett, who died in the Broadwater Farm Estate riots in London in 1985. 

Mad P and Kaye were still performing as Top Buzz, up until Kaye died on 11 March 2023.

Selected discography

Selected singles/EPs
 Livin' in Darkness/Violas Delight (Basement, 1992)
 Livin' in Darkness 93/Maintain Her (Basement, 1993)
 Livin a Dream/The Wok (Basement, 1994)

Selected mixes
 Dreamscape Vol. 02 - The Vision (Dreamscape, 1997)

References

External links 
Top Buzz at Discogs

Musical groups established in 1988
British musical trios
Hardcore techno music groups
English techno music groups
Musical groups from London
Breakbeat hardcore music groups